Christian Schopf (born 12 March 1988) is an Austrian luger who has competed since 2008. A natural track luger, he won two silver medals at the 2009 FIL World Luge Natural Track Championships in Moos, Italy, earning them in the men's doubles and mixed team events.

Schopf also won a gold medal in the mixed team event at the FIL European Luge Natural Track Championships 2010 in St. Sebastian, Austria.

References

 FIL-Luge profile: Schopf, Christian

External links

 

1988 births
Living people
Austrian male lugers